Syndicate: American Revolt is an expansion set designed for the Bullfrog strategy game Syndicate. During the game, the player leads a four-man team of cyborgs through the streets of a dark, dystopian world and through 21 difficult missions.

The game takes place during the 22nd century, after the events of Syndicate. The entire world is controlled by a megacorporation called Eurocorp. The company has become extremely wealthy and powerful after inventing the CHIP, which is a cybernetic implant capable of altering the perceptions of human beings so that the reality of a dystopia is perceived as a utopia.

The citizens of North and South America, tired of high taxes and dangerous streets, are rebelling against Eurocorp control to regain their autonomy. Rival Syndicates are using the revolt as the ideal opportunity to gain the upper hand in the ongoing struggle for supremacy. The player takes the role of a Eurocorp Syndicate executive, and the main objective of the game is to stop a massive revolt in the Americas that threatens the very existence of Eurocorp.

Multiplayer
The PC version of American Revolt includes 10 multiplayer missions played via NetBIOS networking.

Amiga version
The Amiga version of the American Revolt data disk was available exclusively from the merchandise section of Amiga Format magazine.

Reception
Computer Gaming World in 1994 reported that "The increased difficulty of American Revolt amplifies the shortcomings of the original Syndicate, turning niggling foibles into serious impediments to gameplay", citing dangerous hidden enemies and slow graphics and gameplay. The magazine recommended the expansion only to "Hard-core Syndicate nuts".

References

External links

1993 video games
Amiga games
Bullfrog Productions games
Cyberpunk video games
DOS games
Video game expansion packs
Windows games
Video games developed in the United Kingdom
Video games set in the 22nd century